Gourav Choudhury (born 21 June 1999) is an Indian cricketer. He made his Twenty20 debut on 14 January 2021, for Odisha in the 2020–21 Syed Mushtaq Ali Trophy. He made his List A debut on 20 February 2021, for Odisha in the 2020–21 Vijay Hazare Trophy.

References

External links
 

1999 births
Living people
Indian cricketers
Odisha cricketers
Place of birth missing (living people)